Atak Nfang (Hausa: Zaman Dabo) is a district and a village community in Zangon Kataf Local Government Area, southern Kaduna state in the Middle Belt region of Nigeria. The postal code for the area is 802142.

Settlements
 The following are some major settlements in Atak Nfang (Zaman Dabo) district include:
 Atak Agbaat
 Atakmawai (H. Kurmin Masara)
 Atak Nfang (Zaman Dabo)
 Apyia Akoo (Kankurmi)
 Chawai Zaman Dabo
 Chen Akoo (Zama Awon)
 Doka
 Kan Kibori
 Kibori
 Kitibir
 Makomurum 
 Manyi Mashin
 Manyi Sansak
 Marana (Ungwan Rana)
 Sabon Gini
 Ungwan Maichibi

Demographics
The people of Atak Nfang (Zaman Dabo) district are majorly Atyap people. Although settlers from other parts of the country are found in parts of the district.

Note
 Achi, B.; Bitiyonɡ, Y. A.; Bunɡwon, A. D.; Baba, M. Y.; Jim, L. K. N.; Kazah-Toure, M.; Philips, J. E. A Short History of the Atyap (2019). Zaria: Tamaza Publishinɡ Co. Ltd. . Pp. 9–245.

See also
 Atyap chiefdom
 Jei
 Kanai
 List of villages in Kaduna State
 Zango Urban
 Zonzon

References

Populated places in Kaduna State
Atyap chiefdom